Pujaudran is a commune in the Gers department in southwestern France.

Geography

Population

The commune does not have a demonym name for the inhabitants in the village.

See also
Communes of the Gers department

References

Communes of Gers